Highway 32 is a highway in southwestern Saskatchewan, connecting Leader and Swift Current.

History
The first travel in this area was by foot, two wheeled ox carts and horse drawn freight wagons using trails on the sod. The first train arrived in Lancer in 1913. The late 1920s and 1930s saw the automobile arrive to a few families in the area.

Maintenance
The winter of 2000 saw  resurfaced on this highway. The road west of Cabri to the east of Shackleton was repaired.

In 2005,  were resurfaced. Wheel ruts and surface deterioration were levelled and filled and a microsurface treatment was put into place to restore resistance to skidding.

The highway has become infamous for its extremely poor condition, which can primarily be attributed to a substandard pavement design (not built for heavy trucks in the mostly agricultural and oil-producing area) and claims of lack of maintenance. The condition of the route is so bad that ambulances are avoiding the route as much as possible.

On May 17, 2006, Southwest TV News produced a three part series regarding the highway and its road condition. A Letter of understanding (LOU) was signed by 22 southwest towns, municipalities and government offices.

In 2006,  of highway 32 were converted to a gravel road to alleviate the asphalt surface potholes. Residents lobbying for highway repairs published a "Pothole of the Month" calendar, "I Survived Highway 32" bumper stickers and a billboard was erected on the roadside. The Leader ambulance travels on another route a -hour longer to the Regional Hospital in Swift Current because of bad road conditions.

Action Southwest, Area Transportation Planning Council (ATPC), Department of Highways, Highway 37 partnership and Highway 32 partnership came together to resolve the transportation problems and it was decided to undertake    Action Southwest has appointed a transportation study steering committee as well as two consulting firms to monitor progress.

"Thin-membrane" highways are secondary routes providing a dust-free surface, but were never engineered for heavy truck traffic. Heavy trucks need to be rerouted to refurbished routes designed for truck traffice said Highways Minister Eldon Lautermilch. Saskatchewan comprises  of thin-membrane highway.

From the southwest to the northeast of Cabri,  of the highway was resurfaced in the summer of 2007 a part of Phase I Saskatchewan Highways and Infrastructure's 2008 Tender Release.  
  
Highways and Transportation Minister Pat Atkinson allocated $1 million in the spring of 2001. This repair would now handle heavier truck loads on the route.

At a cost of $31.8 million, the  stretch of the Highway between Shackleton and Prelate was upgraded from thin membrane surface (TMS) road to a fully structural paved road designed for full regular highway traffic. This work started on May 4, 2009 and was completed on October 13, 2010.

Communities

The Great Sandhills are located to the south of Highway 32, and the South Saskatchewan river runs to the north of Highway 32. The CPR allocated land along the rail line for the village of Prussia, and soon the RCMP and immigrants arrived to the area. During World War I, the village was renamed to Leader. Along the highway is the village of Sceptre, which hosts The Great Sandhills Museum, metal wheat sculpture, and is the gateway to the great sandhills of Saskatchewan. Lemsford, Portreeve, Shackleton and Battrum are now considered ghost towns of Saskatchewan. The village of Lancer features the Lancer museum which hosts the history of the area, homestead artifacts and a couple of models of the Lancer. George Jaegli was the sculptor who built the  Chokecherry Cluster at Lancer. Abbey is a village of 130 residents. The town of Cabri is located at the junction of Highway 32 and Highway 37 and features oversized goose, antelope and wheat sculptures. To the south on the South Saskatchewan River is the Cabri Regional Park. Southwest Saskatchewan is home to Saskatchewan's first oil fields, and the Fosterton Oilfield Museum at Cabri commemorates this history of the area.  The village of Success is home to 40 residents along Highway 32. In 2006, a  gas storage facility was constructed at Cantuar. The intersection of Highway 332 is to the south of Cantuar.

Major intersections 
From west to east:

See also
 List of Saskatchewan provincial highways

References

External links
Highway 32 action site

032